Signe Munk (born 10 March 1990 in Odense) is a Danish politician, who is a member of the Folketing for the Socialist People's Party. She was elected into parliament at the 2019 Danish general election.

Political career
Munk was a member of the municipal council of Viborg Municipality from 2009 to 2013. She was elected into parliament at the 2019 election, where she received 6,285	personal votes.

References

External links 
 Biography on the website of the Danish Parliament (Folketinget)

1990 births
Living people
People from Odense
Socialist People's Party (Denmark) politicians
Danish municipal councillors
21st-century Danish women politicians
Women members of the Folketing
Members of the Folketing 2019–2022
Members of the Folketing 2022–2026